Horatio Benedict "H.B." Blades, Jr. (born September 30, 1984) is a former American football linebacker in the National Football League. He played college football at Pittsburgh and was drafted by the Washington Redskins in the sixth round of the 2007 NFL Draft.

Early years
Blades attended Plantation High School in Plantation, Florida where he set school records for tackles in a career (409), season (154), and game (21).

College career
Blades became only the fifth player in school history to record over 400 career tackles. He started and played in 12 games during his senior season at Pittsburgh where he was a First-team All-American by the Football Writers Association of America and SportsIllustrated.com and was named Big East Defensive Player of the Year. He was also a First-team All-Big East for the third time. He recorded a career-high 147 tackles (86 solo), 10.5 tackles for a loss, one sack, two fumble recoveries, two interceptions and two blocked field goals as a senior.

Professional career

Washington Redskins
Blades was drafted in the sixth round (179th overall) of the 2007 NFL Draft by the Washington Redskins. In his rookie season, he played mostly special teams and recorded 21 tackles. In 2008, he played 16 games with 5 starts and recorded 60 tackles for the Redskins.

Blades was re-signed on August 1, 2011. On September 3, the Redskins cut Blades just before the start of the 2011 season.

Personal
Blades is the son of retired Pro Bowl defensive back, Bennie Blades. He is also the nephew of retired Seattle Seahawks wide receiver, Brian Blades, and the late San Francisco 49ers safety, Al Blades. He is currently a football coach at Indian Land High School in Indian Land, South Carolina.

On February 28, 2016, the Washington Redskins filed a lawsuit against Blades to recoup $40,000 the team mistakenly paid him in 2013. The Redskins originally paid Blades a $40,000 severance on September 28, 2012 and then mistakenly paid him an additional $40,000 on December 27, 2013. After arbitration, Blades agreed to repay $20,658.88 but failed to make payments. The arbitrator in March 2015 ordered him to repay the full amount.

References

External links
Washington Redskins bio

1984 births
Living people
American football linebackers
Pittsburgh Panthers football players
Washington Redskins players
Players of American football from Fort Lauderdale, Florida
Plantation High School alumni